Salah Eddin Zaimeche Al-Djazair, commonly referred to as Salah Zaimeche or S. E. Al-Djazairi, is an academic and author specializing in the history of Islam.

Career and research 
Zaimeche is currently a researcher in the Department of Geography at the University of Manchester. Zaimeche was previously a lecturer and researcher at the University of Constantine in Algeria for ten years. Zaimeche has also worked at the University of Manchester Institute of Science and Technology.

Zaimeche has been published in many academic journals, on topics including environmental degradation and North Africa. Zaimeche is a contributor to encyclopedias including Encyclopædia Britannica. Zaimeche is the author of six books, all of them about the history of Islam.

Journals that Zaimeche has been published in include Middle Eastern Studies, The Journal of North African Studies, and The Geographical Journal, among others.

Published books 
 The Hidden Debt to Islamic Civilisation (Bayt Al-Hikma Press; Manchester; 2005)
 The Golden Age and Decline of Islamic Civilisation (Bayt Al-Hikma Press; Manchester; 2006)
 A Short History of Islam (The Institute of Islamic History; Manchester; 2006)
 The Crusades (The Institute of Islamic History; Manchester; 2007)
 The Myth of Muslim Barbarism and its Aims (Bayt Al-Hikma Press; Manchester; 2007)

References

External links 
 S. E. Zaimeche's research while affiliated with the University of Manchester and other places at ResearchGate

Historians of Islam
Living people
Year of birth missing (living people)